Andy Samuel (April 10, 1909 – March 5, 1992) was an American child actor most notable for his appearances in 19 Our Gang comedies over a three-year period.

Career
Samuel's film debut in that series was the 1923 short, The Big Show. Samuel was already thirteen before he joined the gang and became the oldest member of the gang. He left the series with a bit part in the 1925 short, Boys Will Be Joys. By the time Samuel left Our Gang he was already sixteen and was the oldest member of the gang.

Death
Samuel died aged 82 from cancer on March 5, 1992.

Selected "Our Gang" Filmography
 The Champeen (1923)
 The Big Show (1923)
 Boys to Board (1923)
 Giants vs. Yanks (1923)
 Back Stage (1923)
 Dogs of War (1923)
 Lodge Night (1923)
 No Noise (1923)
 Big Business (1924)
 The Buccaneers (1924)
 Seein' Things (1924)
 Commencement Day (1924)
 Jubilo, Jr. (1924)
 High Society (1924)
 The Sun Down Limited (1924)
 Every Man for Himself (1924)
 Fast Company (1924)
 The Mysterious Mystery! (1924)
 Boys Will Be Joys (1925)

External links

 

1909 births
1992 deaths
20th-century American male actors
American male child actors
American male silent film actors
Male actors from California
Deaths from cancer in California
American male comedy actors
Hal Roach Studios actors
Our Gang